The 1988 All-Ireland Minor Football Championship was the 57th staging of the All-Ireland Minor Football Championship, the Gaelic Athletic Association's premier inter-county Gaelic football tournament for boys under the age of 18.

Down entered the championship as defending champions and were defeated in the Ulster Championship.

On 18 September 1988, Kerry won the championship following a 2-5 to 0-5 defeat of Dublin in the All-Ireland final. This was their 10th All-Ireland title and their first title in eight championship seasons.

Results

Connacht Minor Football Championship

Quarter-Final

Semi-Finals

Final

Munster Minor Football Championship

Semi-Finals

Final

Leinster Minor Football Championship
 
First Round

Quarter-Finals

Semi-Finals

Final

Ulster Minor Football Championship

Preliminary Round

Quarter-Finals

Semi-Finals

Final

All-Ireland Minor Football Championship

Semi-Finals

Final

References

1988
All-Ireland Minor Football Championship